Tatiana Katherine Loor Hidalgo (born June 18, 1991) is an Ecuadorian beauty pageant titleholder who was crowned Miss International Ecuador 2012. She also represented her country in the 2012 Miss International pageant and Miss Continente Americano 2012.

Personal life
Born in Santo Domingo de los Colorados. Loor speaks Spanish, Italian and English. Her interests are reading and cooking, and she is currently a student of Administration at Universidad Tecnológica Equinoccial.

Miss Ecuador 2012 
The event was broadcast live on 16 March 2012 from La Libertad, where she obtained the title of Miss International Ecuador, gaining the right to represent her country in Miss International 2012.

Miss Continente Americano 2012 
Loor, competed as the Ecuadorian representative in Miss Continente Americano 2012 on September 29, 2012, in Guayaquil, Ecuador. She was appointed by Miss Ecuador Organization because the original winner, Carolina Aguirre, was not being able to compete due to a clash with the Miss Universe 2012 event.

References

External links
Official Miss Ecuador website

 

1991 births
Miss International 2012 delegates
Living people
Ecuadorian beauty pageant winners